Zunderdorp is a town in the Dutch province of North Holland. It is a part of the municipality of Amsterdam, and lies about 7 km northeast of Amsterdam.

In 2001, the town of Zunderdorp had 237 inhabitants. The built-up area of the town was 0.05 km², and contained 91 residences. The village is a part of the deelgemeente (sub-municipality or borough) Amsterdam-Noord.

References

Populated places in North Holland
Amsterdam-Noord
Geography of Amsterdam